Mammillaria pennispinosa is a species of cactus. It is endemic to Mexico, where it is known only from a single location in Durango. Its total population is fewer than 1250 individuals. They grow on volcanic rock in desert habitat.

References

pennispinosa
Cacti of Mexico
Endemic flora of Mexico
Flora of Durango
Endangered biota of Mexico
Endangered plants
Taxonomy articles created by Polbot